Colonel Prince Yi U (15 November 1912 – 7 August 1945) was a member of the imperial family of Korea as a prince, the 4th head of Unhyeon Palace, and a lieutenant colonel in the Imperial Japanese Army during World War II. He was killed during the atomic bombing of Hiroshima.

Biography 
He was born the second son of  Prince Kang, the fifth son of  Emperor Gojong.

At the age of five, he was adopted to be the heir of deceased Prince Yeongseon, the 3rd head of Unhyeon Palace and the only son of the elder brother of Emperor Gojong, Prince Hui. He was taken to Japan shortly afterwards under the pretense of educational purposes.

However, unlike his elder brother, Prince Geon, he maintained his identity as a Korean, despite his Japanese education. This made him the favorite son of his father, Prince Kang, who himself attempted to escape from Korea to join the exiled Korean government. He overcame all attempts by the Japanese to marry him off to a minor Japanese noble,  and married Lady Park Chan-ju of the Bannam Park clan, a granddaughter of Marquis Pak Yung-hio who was a husband of Princess Yŏnghye of Korea. They had two children, Yi Cheong and Yi Jong.

Prince Yi served in the Japanese Army and was stationed in China. Commissioned a second lieutenant on 25 October 1933, he was promoted to lieutenant on 25 October 1935, to captain on 1 March 1938, to major on 15 October 1941 and to lieutenant colonel on 10 June 1945.

Death 
Prince U was transferred to Hiroshima in 1945, and on 6 August 1945, he was mortally injured by the atomic bomb blast on the way to his office, and died later that day at a medical aid station. He was posthumously promoted to the rank of colonel. On August 8, Adjutant Lieutenant Colonel Yoshinari Hiroshi (吉成 弘) committed suicide on account of not being able to save Prince Yi. Thereafter his body was moved to Korea and was buried in Heungwon on 15 August 1945, the day the war ended.

Popular culture 
 Portrayed by Go Soo in the 2016 film The Last Princess.

See also
 Korea under Japanese rule
 Korean Imperial Household

References

Japanese military personnel killed in World War II
Hibakusha
House of Yi
Korean nobility
Heirs apparent who never acceded
Japanese nobility
1912 births
1945 deaths
Imperial Japanese Army personnel of World War II
Deaths by airstrike during World War II
Imperial Japanese Army officers
Deaths by American airstrikes